The Leibis-Lichte Dam is a  dam in the German state of Thuringia in the Thuringian Highland. The dam was completed in 2005 to impound the River Lichte, between the Lichte municipality section Geiersthal and Unterweissbach. To that particular storage reservoir belongs the Deesbach Forebay (German: Vorsperre Deesbach). The name of the dam, "Leibis-Lichte Dam" was derived from the close proximity to the municipalities of Leibis and Lichte, as well as from the Lichte River as being the main inlet.

Construction 
The Leibis-Lichte Dam was constructed in the time period from 2002 to September 2005.

Inside the formwork, heavy equipment was used to spread and compact the large quantities of concrete.

Pictures

See also 
 List of reservoirs and dams in Germany

References

External links 

Leibis-Lichte Dam on  homepage of the Thuringian long-distance water supply (de: Tueringer Fernwasserversorgung
Homepage (private) concerning the Leibis-Lichte Dam
Pictures of the building site on baustellen-doku.info

Dams in Thuringia
Lichte
Dams completed in 2005
Buildings and structures in Saalfeld-Rudolstadt